In the 2018–19 rugby union season, the  participated in the 2018–19 Pro14 competition, their second appearance since joining the competition in 2017–18.

Personnel

Coaches and management

The following coaching team was announced for the 2018–19 Pro14 season:

Squad

The Southern Kings squad for the 2018–19 Pro14 is:

Player movements

Player movements between the 2017–18 Pro14 season and the end 2018–19 Pro14 season are as follows:

Standings

The final Conference B log standings were:

Round-by-round

The table below shows the Southern Kings' progression throughout the season. For each round, their cumulative points total is shown with the conference position:

Matches

The Southern Kings' matches in the 2018–19 Pro14 were:

Player statistics

The Pro14 appearance record for players that represented the Southern Kings in 2018–19 is as follows:

See also

 Southern Kings
 Pro14

References

Southern Kings seasons
Southern Kings
Southern Kings
Southern Kings